Michael Nii Aryee Kurdle-Armah(born 16 October 1991) is a Ghanaian businessman and CEO of Kurdle Music Worldwide, a record label based in West Palm Beach and Accra, Ghana.

Early life
Kurdle-Armah was born in Jamestown a suburb of Accra in Ghana. He attended St. Pauls Lutheran School, Kanda for his junior high school education and then moved on to Adisadel College, Cape Coast for his senior high school education. He then proceeded to the Kwame Nkrumah University of Science and Technology were he earned a bachelor's degree in political science.

Career
Kurdle-Armah is the Founder and CEO of Kurdle Music Worldwide a record label based in West Palm Beach and Accra, Ghana. In 2021 he signed Gospel musician Perpetual Didier to a five-year contract to the label.

References

1991 births
Living people